Tom Gamble may refer to:

Tom Gamble (athlete) (born 1991), Australian sprinter
Tom Gamble (racing driver) (born 2001), British racing driver